The Mayor of the City of Hoboken is the head of the executive branch of government of Hoboken, New Jersey, United States. The mayor has the duty to enforce the municipal charter and ordinances; prepare the annual budget; appoint deputy mayors, department heads, and aides; and approve or veto ordinances passed by the City Council. The mayor is popularly elected in a nonpartisan general election. The office is held for a four-year term without term limits.

Thirty-eight individuals have held the office of mayor since the City of Hoboken was chartered on March 29, 1855. Cornelius V. Clickener was the inaugural mayor of the city, and served two consecutive terms. The current mayor is Ravinder Bhalla; he was first elected in November 2017. On July 20, 2010, the Hoboken Council voted to move the nonpartisan municipal elections to be held on the same day as the statewide general election in November.

Duties and powers
The City of Hoboken is organized as a mayor-council form of government under the Optional Municipal Charter Law. This provides for a citywide elected mayor serving in an executive role, as well as a city council serving in a legislative role. All of these offices are selected in a nonpartisan municipal election and all terms are four years. Under state law, the mayor has the duty to enforce the charter and ordinances of the city, and all applicable state laws; report annually to the council and the public on the state of the city; supervise and control all departments of the government; prepare and submit to the council annual operating and capital budgets; supervise all city property, institutions and agencies; sign all contracts and bonds requiring the approval of the city; negotiate all contracts; and serve as a member, either voting or ex officio, of all appointive bodies.

The mayor has the power to appoint departments heads with the approval of the City Council; to remove department heads subject to a two-thirds disapproval by the City Council; approve or veto ordinances subject to an override vote of two-thirds of the council; and appoint deputy mayors.  The mayor is permitted to attend and participate in meetings of the City Council, without a vote, except in the case of a tie on the question to fill a council vacancy.

Succession
In the event of an absence, disability, or other cause preventing the mayor from performing his duties, the mayor may designate the business administrator or any other department head as acting mayor for up to 60 days. In the event of a vacancy in the office, the President of the City Council becomes acting mayor, and the council has 30 days to name an interim mayor. If no interim mayor is named, the Council President continues as acting mayor until a successor is elected, or until the council reorganizes and selects a new President. Prior to 1971, there was no automatic succession law.

Mayors

Notes

References
General

Specific

External links
Hoboken Mayor Cammarano arrested by FBI: report
N.J. officials, N.Y. rabbis caught in federal money laundering, corruption sweep
Mayors of Hoboken, New Jersey at Political Graveyard

 
Hoboken, New Jersey